The 1943–44 Panhellenic Championship did not occur due the events of the WW2 and the Axis occupation of Greece. In May 1943, football matches were organized by the municipality of Piraeus. Based on what has become known, Olympiacos and Panathinaikos participated in them, while in December of the same year a Holiday Cup, later called  "Christmas Cup" was held, in which the Olympiacos, Panathinaikos and AEK Athens competed. All 3 games were conducted on Leoforos Alexandras Stadium This was in fact the only event during the years of The Occupation that was completed. In February 1944, the disputes between the HFF and the Union of Greek Athletes caused Panathinaikos to create the "Panathinaikos Tournament", but it failed to end. There were 2 groups created, 1 in Athens and 1 in Piraeus. Not a single score is known. Furthermore, little is known about the "Unified Center Championship", which started in February 1944 with 3 groups of 22 teams. There were 2 groups of 7 teams from Athens and 1 of 8 teams from Piraeus. The point system was: Win: 3 points - Draw: 2 points - Loss: 1 point.

|+Holiday Cup

|}

See also
Christmas Cup

References

External links
Rsssf, 1943–44 championship

1943–44 in Greek football
Panhellenic Championship seasons
Greece
Athens in World War II